Panic Restaurant, known in Japan as , is a 1992 platform game developed by EIM and published by Taito for the Nintendo Entertainment System.

Panic Restaurant stars a chef named Cookie who must navigate through his own restaurant, which has been cursed by a rival chef named Ohdove. Cookie has to battle evil food monsters with kitchen utensil weapons in six levels before taking on Ohdove in a final battle.

Gameplay

Development
Kenji Eno was the game's designer. The names of the game's main character and villain were changed when the game was localized for Western audiences. In the Japanese version, the hero is a chef named Kokkun. The main villain was named "Hors d'Oeuvre"; the name "Ohdove" was the result of an incorrect transliteration of a French word to Japanese and then to English. In the overseas versions the "Clobber Pan" replaced the chef's head as the default weapon. Also, the best weapon was the "Wacky Pan", which did not exist in the Japanese version.

Reception

Panic Restaurant received generally positive reviews from video game critics. Power Unlimited gave a score of 80% commenting: "Panic Restaurant is one of the tastiest platform games of all time. You work your way through the six levels in this game, because there is good food everywhere. The juicy graphics and crunchy humor only add to this."

Notes

References

External links
 Panic Restaurant at GameFAQs
 

1992 video games
Fictional chefs
Fictional restaurants
Nintendo Entertainment System games
Nintendo Entertainment System-only games
Platform games
Side-scrolling video games
Single-player video games
Taito games
Video games about food and drink
Video games scored by Hirohiko Takayama
Video games scored by Kenji Eno
Video games developed in Japan